Wipeout Canada is a Canadian English reality television series in which multiple contestants compete in numerous obstacle-based challenges. The series is produced by DTour and premiered on that channel on April 3, 2011. The studio hosts are Jonathan Torrens and Ennis Esmer, with Jessica Phillips as the on-site reporter.

Gameplay 
The series follows a similar format to the American version of the game. Twenty contestants (four fewer than the US version), aged 18 years and older, compete in four rounds: "The Qualifier", "The Sweeper", "The Dizzy Dummy", and "The Wipeout Zone". The last contestant standing in the Sweeper Round bypasses the Dizzy Dummy and automatically advances to the Wipeout Zone, unlike the US version where the last contestant standing wins a $1,000 bonus. Four contestants make it to the final round, called the "Wipeout Zone", for the chance to win $50,000.

Production 
The Wipeout format is licensed to Lone Eagle Entertainment, an independent production company based in Toronto.  The company announced multiple casting calls for English-speaking Canadians over 19 years of age.  The application process for season 1 was open from June 2 to July 1, 2010.  Out of 44,619 applicants, 260 were chosen to be contestants.  In October 2010, thirteen one-hour episodes were taped on the Wipeout set in Buenos Aires, Argentina.

Wipeout Canada was not renewed for a second season.

References

External links
 Official site

2011 Canadian television series debuts
Canada
2010s Canadian reality television series
2010s Canadian game shows
2011 Canadian television series endings
Canadian television series based on American television series
Television shows filmed in Argentina